Towar–Ennis Farmhouse and Barn Complex is a historic farm complex located at Lyons in the Wayne County, New York.  The contributing elements of the complex include a vernacular Greek Revival style farmhouse, two barns (one with silo), a carriage house, a corncrib, a smoke house, a stone retaining wall, and a hitching post.  The farmhouse consists of a two-story, three-bay wide, sidehall plan main block built in 1832, with a 1 1/2 story side wing added in 1852.  A rear kitchen wing was added in 1986.  The main barn was built in 1852.  The complex is representative of rural agrarian farmsteads of the 19th and early-20th centuries in the Finger Lakes Region.

It was listed on the National Register of Historic Places in 2009.

References

Farms on the National Register of Historic Places in New York (state)
Greek Revival houses in New York (state)
Houses completed in 1832
Houses in Wayne County, New York
National Register of Historic Places in Wayne County, New York